The 1948 United States presidential election in Arkansas took place on November 2, 1948, as part of the 1948 United States presidential election. State voters chose nine representatives, or electors, to the Electoral College, who voted for president and vice president. This would be the last presidential election where Arkansas had nine electoral votes: the Great Migration would see the state lose three congressional districts in the next decade-and-a-half.

Background
Except for the Unionist Ozark counties of Newton and Searcy where Republicans controlled local government, Arkansas since the end of Reconstruction had been a classic one-party Democratic "Solid South" state. Disfranchisement of effectively all black people and most poor whites had meant that outside those two aberrant counties, the Republican Party was completely moribund and Democratic primaries the only competitive elections.

However, ever since seeing the potential effect on the United States' image abroad (and ability to win the Cold War against the radically egalitarian rhetoric of Communism) of the beating and blinding of Isaac Woodard three hours after being discharged from the army, President Truman was attempting to launch a Civil Rights bill, involving desegregation of the military. This produced severe opposition from Southern Democrats, who aimed to have South Carolina Governor James Strom Thurmond listed as Democratic Presidential nominee and Mississippi Governor Fielding Wright as Vice-Presidential nominee.

Unlike Oklahoma, Tennessee, North Carolina or Virginia, Arkansas did not have a major threat from the Republican Party to block local Democratic support for Thurmond, but it had only half the proportion of blacks found in Mississippi or South Carolina. At the time when it became clear that a Southern fracture from the national Democratic Party was on the agenda, Arkansas was deeply divided between a Dixiecrat faction headed by outgoing Governor Ben T. Laney and a loyalist faction led by Sidney S. McMath.

McMath was to win the Democratic gubernatorial primary that was in this one-party state tantamount to election, and despite the efforts of Laney and state party chairman Arthur Adams, it was clear from the beginning of the campaign that they held little sway over the Democratic rank and file who were loyal to Truman.

In May 1948 Governor Laney became chairman of the "States' Rights Democrats"; however on July 12 the possibility of Laney himself becoming the nominee ended when he refused to support anyone. However, as late as the September 22 Democratic Convention the Dixiecrats had hopes of pledging Arkansas' Democratic presidential electors to Thurmond and Wright; however McMath and Congressman Charles Fuller were able to persuade the electors to remain loyal to President Truman.

Vote
With the state's Democratic electors pledged to Truman, the incumbent President and running mate Kentucky Senator Alben W. Barkley easily carried Arkansas with 61.72% of the popular vote, against New York Governor Thomas Dewey and California Governor Earl Warren's 21.02% of the popular vote. Vis-à-vis the 1944 election, Truman picked up Benton County and Searcy County, the latter of which had previously only voted Democratic once since the Civil War.

Thurmond, running as a third-party candidate, was able to capture 16.52 percent of Arkansas' vote. The Dixiecrats ran strongest in the Delta region of the state where Truman's Civil Rights and "Fair Deal" policies were most feared by the powerful Black Belt planters; Thurmond carried three counties with entirely nonvoting black majorities and was second in twenty-eight others. However, in the hilly northwestern half of the state, Thurmond failed to crack 5 percent of the vote in eighteen counties. , this is the last election in which Benton County and Sebastian County voted for a Democratic presidential candidate. Arkansas was also the only state in the entire country where Norman Thomas beat Henry Wallace.

Results

Results by county

See also
 United States presidential elections in Arkansas

Notes

References

Arkansas
1948
1948 Arkansas elections